Aydin Salman oglu Valiyev, better known by his stage name Aydinchik, born on July 18, 1959, is an Azerbaijani singer and songwriter. His music, mostly in the chanson genre, was at its most popular between 1970 and 1980.

Biography 
Valiyev was born on July 18, 1959 in Baku, Azerbaijan. His family's circumstances were modest. His elementary schooling began in 1965; he graduated from his secondary school, Music High School No. 26, in 1975. Before embarking on his performing career, he worked as an electrician (that is, a lighting technician) in a television studio and, subsequently, in the film industry. He relocated to Russia in 1977, and remained there for more than a decade.

Discography

Songs

References

External links
 

20th-century Azerbaijani male singers
Musicians from Baku
Living people
1959 births